The Hackney Brook is one of the subterranean rivers of London. It crossed the northern parts of the current London boroughs of Hackney and Islington, emptying into the River Lea at Old Ford, with its source in Holloway.

Course of the River 

In Hackney, the river ran through the northern part of Clissold Park, where its course is now marked by two lakes. It crossed the artificial New River, which flowed at right angles to the brook and left the park to the south (until the 1940s when the New River flow was terminated at the East Reservoir). The two Clissold park lakes are now fed from the main water supply, not the brook.

It then wandered through Abney Park Cemetery to cross at the bottom of the road Stamford Hill to run along the north side of Stoke Newington Common. At this point, builders found, in the 1860s, very early evidence of human occupation in the form of 200,000-year-old palaeolithic flint axes, which were being made on the banks of the brook. These are among the earliest human artifacts found in Britain.

From here, the brook followed the western side of Hackney Downs, then ran south-east to cross Dalston Lane and Mare Street in Hackney Central near Bohemia Place. Many 18th and 19th-century illustrations show the ford here, which was at the bend in the road where the North London Railway bridge now crosses Mare Street. 
 
In central Hackney, the brook was joined by the Pigwell Brook which flowed down from Dalston, roughly following the line of Graham Road. From Hackney Central it ran through Homerton, reaching Hackney Wick where it turned south, parallel to the Lea, before reaching Old Ford, where Victorian OS maps show a confluence with the Lea immediately south of the Northern Outfall Sewer and immediately north of what the maps state as the location of the former 'Old Ford' across the Lea.

In its heyday, up until the late 1830s, the brook was a substantial river, 10 metres wide in full flood at Stoke Newington and perhaps 30 metres wide at its junction with the Lea.

Its course can be seen on some old maps .

Disappearance 

Although much of the Hackney Brook had already been covered over by 1856, local population growth in the area had turned the open portions into little more than an open sewer. In response to this, the Metropolitan Board of Works constructed its northern high-level sewer in 1860 to a design by Sir Joseph Bazalgette to contain the brook and its many tributaries. The sewer followed the course of the brook as far as Hackney Church Street (now Mare Street), but then struck south to cross Victoria Park, joining the larger sewer network at Old Ford.

Proposed deculverting 
In 2016, Trevor ApSimon, a local organ-grinder, proposed restoring and deculverting the river from its source in Holloway to the Lea Navigation. Focusing on the reaches below Hackney Central, he called for the creation of a theme route, "encouraging citizens to stroll down from Hackney-on-High to Hackney-on-Sea on a Sunday morning." Hackney Green Party mayoral candidate Samir Jeraj supported the idea, but Tom Bolton, author of a guide to London's lost rivers, said the scheme was a complete non-starter.

See also
Subterranean rivers of London

References 

Geography of the London Borough of Hackney
Subterranean rivers of London
Tributaries of the River Lea
1Hackney